Dmitry Tursunov won the first edition of this tournament, by defeating Lukáš Rosol 6–4, 6–2 in the final.

Seeds

Draw

Finals

Top half

Bottom half

References
 Main Draw
 Qualifying Draw

Singapore ATP Challenger - Singles
2011 Singles
2011 in Singaporean sport